"Stitches" is a song by Canadian singer Shawn Mendes for his debut studio album, Handwritten (2015). It was initially released to iTunes via Island Records on March 16, 2015, as the third pre-order exclusive track and was subsequently serviced to radio via Republic Records on May 5, 2015, as the album's third official single. "Stitches" is the first song by Mendes to appear on a Billboard airplay chart, debuting at number 36 on the Mainstream Top 40 chart in June 2015, and eventually reaching number one. It became his first top 10 single on the Billboard Hot 100, charting at number four. "Stitches" also reached the top 10 on the Canadian Hot 100, peaking at number 10. It also topped the Slovenian SloTop50 Chart, Scottish Official Charts Company and UK Singles Chart and reached the top 5 in Germany, Ireland, Australia and New Zealand.

It was nominated for Choice Music Single: Male Artist at the 2015 Teen Choice Awards.

Background
"Stitches", a pop ballad,  is the first major single recorded by Shawn Mendes after being signed to Island Records. Mendes's vocals span one and a half octave, from D3 to an A4 belt after the bridge which continues into the chorus. It was written and produced by Danny Parker, Teddy Geiger, and Daniel Kyriakides, and recorded by Mendes in 2014. After that, it was initially released to iTunes via Island Records on March 16, 2015, as the third pre-order exclusive track and was subsequently serviced to radio via Republic Records on May 5, 2015, as the album's third official single.

The official music video of "Stitches" takes place in a parking garage, where Mendes seems to be thrown around by some invisible force which represents his emotions.

Critical reception
The New York Times Jon Caramanica named "Stitches" the 14th best song of the year, writing the "Vine star makes good with low-key slice of handclap pop."

Chart performance
"Stitches" debuted at number 55 on the Billboard Canadian Hot 100 on the chart dated April 4, 2015. It was the most-added song at Canadian contemporary hit radio for the week of June 13, 2015 and debuted at number 50 on the Canada CHR/Top 40 airplay chart for that week. Later, it re-entered the chart at number 40 and eventually peaked at number 10.

In the United States, the song debuted at number 14 on the Billboard Bubbling Under Hot 100 Singles on the chart dated April 25, 2015. It rose to number two on the Bubbling Under chart for the week of June 6, 2015 before debuting on the Billboard Hot 100 proper at number 89 for the chart dated June 13, 2015. On the week ending August 27, 2015, the song entered the top 40 at number 35, climbed seven positions from number 42. The song jumped 12 spots to enter the top 20 at number 20 for the week ending September 10, 2015. The song entered the top 10 at number nine for the chart dated October 17, 2015 and climbed to number eight on the following week. On the week ending October 31, 2015, it entered the top 5 at number four, becoming Mendes' highest-peaking song on the chart at the time, as well as his first top 5 hit. "Stitches" debuted at number 36 on the Billboard Mainstream Top 40 chart for the week ending June 20, 2015, becoming his first US airplay hit. It has since peaked at number one on the chart, becoming his first number one hit. It was certified 6× Platinum by the Recording Industry Association of America (RIAA) in September 2017 and has sold 2.7 million downloads as of September 2017. The song spent a total of 52 weeks on the Billboard Hot 100 before dropping out on June 11, 2016.

In Sweden, "Stitches" entered the Swedish Singles Chart on the chart dated April 3, 2015 at number 92. It gradually rose up the charts and reached number 58, before dropping out a few weeks later. As it was getting more successful worldwide, "Stitches" re-entered the chart at number 79 on the week ending July 3, 2015. The song peaked at number two on the week ending October 9, 2015, making it the song's best chart performance in any region so far. It has been certified Platinum by the International Federation of the Phonographic Industry of Sweden as of September 9, 2015. In the United Kingdom, "Stitches" debuted at number 98 on the UK Singles Chart in August, 2015. Eventually, it entered the top 40 in December of the same year, and on January 22, 2016 – for the week ending date January 28, 2016 – it dethroned Justin Bieber's "Love Yourself" from the top of the chart, finishing just over 1,500 combined chart sales ahead. In Australia, the song debuted at number 48 on the ARIA Singles Chart on the chart dated October 26, 2015. It later peaked at number 4 on the chart dated 7 December 2015. The song was certified Platinum by Australian Recording Industry Association (ARIA).

Music video
A first music video for "Stitches" was directed by Jon Jon Augustavo and premiered on Vevo March 18, 2015, following the song's release to digital retailers. It features the same actress, Ivy Matheson, that appears in his videos for "Never Be Alone" and "Life of the Party" and is the third installment in the Handwritten music video series, but has been later made private.

Mendes eventually announced a new music video for the song on his Instagram account, which was premiered on June 24, 2015. The clip begins with Mendes driving his car into an abandoned parking lot where he gets out and begins singing the song's verses. As he does an invisible force or a ghost is knocking him over in various ways. As the song goes on the force or ghost gets more vicious and slams his head into his car window. Mendes regains strength and runs through the parking lot but the force or ghost knocks his body into a wall where he goes to a bathroom to wash off his disabled face but after rinsing it finds that it has gone back to normal. As a child, Mendes would pretend to be attacked by a ghost. As of February 2022, the "Stitches" YouTube video has been viewed over 1.4 billion times.

In July 2015, an acoustic version video duet with Hailee Steinfeld was also released.

Live performances
Mendes appeared on Good Morning America on April 17, 2015, to promote the then-newly released album and performed "Stitches". On April 29, 2015, he performed the song live on both The Ellen DeGeneres Show and on Conan as the episodes' musical guest. On June 21, 2015, he performed the song at the 2015 Much Music Video Awards. Mendes sang "Stitches" again at the 2016 People's Choice Awards, followed by a performance of "I Know What You Did Last Summer" with Camila Cabello. It was also performed on The Jonathan Ross Show. Mendes performed the track on The Voice UK final on 9 April 2016. He has also performed a stripped-down version at the 2016 Billboard Music Awards. His performance was praised by several publications such as Rolling Stone and TIME, with particular praise towards his vocal performance and instrumental skills. In the finals of the Voice Kids in the Philippines, Justin Alva made this the duet song and ended up in third place.

Remix
The song was remixed by Norwegian production duo SeeB. The track was released as "Stitches (SeeB Remix)" on 16 October 2015 on Island Records, a division of UMG Recordings, Inc.

Charts

Weekly charts

Year-end charts

Decade-end charts

Certifications

See also
 List of best-selling singles in Australia
 List of number-one adult contemporary singles of 2016 (U.S.)

References

External links

2015 songs
2015 singles
Island Records singles
Republic Records singles
Songs written by Teddy Geiger
Pop ballads
Number-one singles in Scotland
UK Singles Chart number-one singles
Songs written by Danny Parker (songwriter)
Shawn Mendes songs
Torch songs